Josh Fusitua is a New Zealand rugby union player who plays for the  in Super Rugby. His playing position is prop. He was named in the Blues squad for the rescheduled Round 1 of the 2022 Super Rugby Pacific season. He made his debut in the same fixture, coming on as a replacement.

References

New Zealand rugby union players
Living people
Rugby union props
Blues (Super Rugby) players
2001 births
Auckland rugby union players